Francisco Tena may refer to:

 Francisco Tena (footballer, 1901-1954), Spanish football forward
 Francisco Tena (footballer, born 1993), Spanish football midfielder